Dario Andrés Rodriguez Parra (born 15 May 1995) is a Colombian professional footballer who plays as a forward for Ascenso MX club Correcaminos UAT.

Career statistics

Club

1 Includes Superliga Colombiana, Recopa Sudamericana and Suruga Bank Championship.

Honours

Club 
Santa Fe
Copa Sudamericana    : 2015
Categoría Primera A  : 2014-II
Superliga Colombiana : 2013, 2015

References

1995 births
Living people
Colombian footballers
Colombian expatriate footballers
Association football forwards
Categoría Primera A players
Independiente Santa Fe footballers
Fortaleza C.E.I.F. footballers
Atlético Bucaramanga footballers
Deportivo Pasto footballers
Once Caldas footballers
Correcaminos UAT footballers
Footballers from Bogotá
Colombian expatriate sportspeople in Mexico
Expatriate footballers in Mexico